"Lowlife" is a song by American singer Poppy (under her former stage name "That Poppy"), from her 2016 EP Bubblebath. It was released by Island Records on July 24, 2015, as the first single from the EP. The song's music video has since amassed over 69 million views on YouTube, becoming Poppy's first song to gain wide attention. It was later included on the 2016 compilation album Now 58 as a "NOW What's Next" track. A remix of the song by Travis Mills was released on October 16, 2015 and another by Slushii on April 29, 2016.

Music video
A music video for the song, directed by Poppy's former collaborator Titanic Sinclair was released on July 24, 2015. The video features cameos from Brandon Burtis, Matt Bennett, Jimmy Redhawk James and Rene Napoli. It has since amassed over 68 million views on YouTube. The video shows Poppy sitting in a chair in a Baphomet-like pose, while men in full-body outfits dance around her. Some men in business suits watch Poppy's every move as she gets up to dance. Poppy sits down at a table with the Devil, who sucks on a banana as a sexual symbol, annoying Poppy so much that she gets up and walks off-set. Poppy signs some fans' pictures of her, then walks back in and shoves aside the off-screen men in suits.

An acoustic performance of the song was uploaded to Poppy's YouTube channel on September 18, 2015. The video features Poppy singing in front of the men in full-body suits.

Live performances 
This song was performed by Poppy at a few live shows in 2016, once on the Poppy.Computer Tour in 2018, and regularly on the Am I a Girl? Tour in 2018.

Track listing

Release history

References

2015 singles
2015 songs
Island Records singles
Poppy (entertainer) songs
Songs written by Simon Wilcox
Songs written by Sir Nolan
Songs about loneliness